Press Gazette, formerly known as UK Press Gazette (UKPG), is a British media trade magazine dedicated to journalism and the press. First published in 1965, it had a circulation of about 2,500, before becoming online-only in 2013. Published with the motto The Future of Media, it contains news from the worlds of newspapers, magazines, TV, radio and online, dealing with launches, closures, moves, legislation and technological advances affecting journalists.

Commercially, it is funded by subscriptions and by publication of recruitment and classified advertising, as well as occasional display advertising. Since 2010 it has been owned by Progressive Media International, which also owns the magazines New Statesman and Spear's.

History
Press Gazette was launched in November 1965 by Colin Valdar, his wife Jill, and his brother Stewart. Upon the Valdars' retirement in 1983 the magazine was sold to Timothy Benn, who sold it in 1990 to the Canadian publishing company Maclean Hunter.

The magazine was sold again in 1994, this time to EMAP. Three years later the magazine was sold again, along with MediaWeek and 12 other titles, to Quantum Business Media for £14.1 million.

High-profile owners and closure
Rupert Murdoch's son-in-law Matthew Freud became the new owner of Press Gazette in May 2005, entering into partnership with former Daily Mirror editor Piers Morgan to raise around £600,000 to buy the title. The purchase was part of the break-up of Quantum Business Media by its owners, the venture-capital group ABN Amro Capital.

On 19 October 2006, Freud announced that the magazine was for sale, citing as a reason indifference in the newspaper industry to the British Press Awards.

The company owned by Freud and Morgan, Press Gazette Limited, subsequently entered administrative receivership.

Initially, the receivers were unable to find another buyer for the magazine, and on 24 November 2006 it closed.

Acquisition and relaunch
After the publication missed one issue, Wilmington Group plc announced on 5 December 2006 that it had acquired the title. Wilmington Media editorial director Tony Loynes, a former Press Gazette editor, led the take-over. He named news editor Dominic Ponsford as editor, and the magazine moved from Fleet Street to Wilmington Media's Old Street headquarters.

Both the magazine and its website PressGazette.co.uk underwent a redesign in May 2007, including a new masthead and body font. The magazine switched from weekly to monthly publication in August 2008.

On 6 April 2009, Wilmington Group announced the May 2009 issue would be the last, but the magazine was purchased on 22 April 2009 by Mike Danson of the Progressive Media Group, shortly after he attained full control of the New Statesman, in April 2009. The Wilmington Group retained the British Press Awards.

Press Gazette went to a quarterly publication in June 2012. At the beginning of 2013, it ended print publication; keeping a weekly digital edition.

Magazine Design and Journalism Awards
Since about 1998, the Press Gazette award the Magazine Design and Journalism Awards in multiple categories. One source said "They are considered the only awards which celebrate design and journalism across all magazine sectors – consumer, B2B and customer."

Awards were presented in the following categories:

Magazine Design Awards
Young Designer of the Year
Best Designed Feature Spread
Best New Design/Redesign
Best Designed Front Cover
Best Use of Typography
Best Use of Illustration
Best Use of Photography
Magazine Designer of the Year
Best Designed Magazine of the Year
Magazine Journalism Awards
Exclusive of the Year
Feature Writer of the Year
Interviewer of the Year
Columnist of the Year
News Reporter of the Year
Business Reporter of the Year
Production Team of the Year
Reviewer of the Year
Digital Journalist of the Year
Editor of the Year

See also 

 Editor & Publisher - Covering the American newspaper industry

References

External links
Press Gazette website
The British Press Awards website
Piers Morgan's Official Website
Press Gazette publisher looks for buyers The Guardian, 9 December 2004
Piers Morgan turns proprietor with purchase of Press Gazette The Guardian, 28 May 2005
And the Press Gazette title goes to ... Piers Morgan The Guardian, 10 June 2005
Press Gazette honours journalists with Hall of Fame exhibition Brand Republic, 22 November 2005
Big titles boycott 'Morgan's organ' press awards The Telegraph, 24 January 2006
Single sponsor for Press Awards The Guardian, 3 March 2006
Digital Edition of Press Gazette
Roy Greenslade, Press Gazette 1965-2006

1965 establishments in the United Kingdom
Weekly magazines published in the United Kingdom
Magazines established in 1965
Mass media trade magazines
Works about newspaper publishing